Leica may refer to:

Companies
 Ernst Leitz GmbH, later divided into:
 Leica Biosystems GmbH, a cancer diagnostics company
 Leica Camera AG, a German camera and optics manufacturer
 Leica Geosystems AG, a Swiss manufacturer of surveying and geomatics equipment
 Leica Microsystems GmbH, a German manufacturer of microscopes and other precision optics

Other uses
 "Leica", a song from the album Akeldama by Faceless
 Leica (river), Romania
 Leica reel, a type of animatic production method for animation

See also
 Laika (disambiguation)
 Lieka, a former settlement in Ethiopia